Stanley "Huck" Gutman (born December 24, 1943) is an American academic and political advisor. He is a professor of English at the University of Vermont and former chief of staff to presidential candidate Bernie Sanders. He is the co-author of Sanders's political memoir, Outsider in the White House.

Early life
Stanley Gutman was born on December 24, 1943. He graduated from the University of Vermont. While he was in college, he got the nickname "Huck" from Huckleberry Finn for walking barefoot around the campus. He received a PhD from Duke University.

Career
Gutman is a professor of English at the University of Vermont. He is an expert on "20th-century American, 19th-century U.S. Poetry, Modern Poetry." He is the co-editor of a book about Michel Foucault as well as a collection of essays about the global critical reception of American literature. He has also written articles for the Monthly Review, two of which he co-authored with Harry Magdoff. He has written about Yehuda Amichai, an Israeli poet.

Gutman was chief of staff to presidential candidate Bernie Sanders in the United States Senate until 2012. He co-authored Outsider in the House, Sanders's political memoir, which was republished as Outsider in the White House in 2015.

Personal life
Gutman lives with his wife, Bertha and their children in Burlington, Vermont.

Works

References

Living people
1943 births
Writers from Burlington, Vermont
University of Vermont alumni
Duke University alumni
University of Vermont faculty
American political writers
Bernie Sanders